Alella may refer to:
Alella, a town in the Maresme county in Catalonia, Spain
Alella (DO), a wine-growing region around the abovementioned town
Alella (crustacean), genus of copepods (crustaceans)